Saw is a town of Saw Township in Gangaw District in the Magway Division in Burma.

Township capitals of Myanmar
Populated places in Magway Region